Graham Cooper (born 22 May 1962) is an English former professional footballer who played as a midfielder for Huddersfield Town before moving to Wrexham for a fee of £25,000 in 1987. He had a loan spell with York City before joining Halifax Town in January 1991. He was released by Halifax in May 1992 having played just twice for the Shaymen.

He later played for Lepton Highlanders in the Huddersfield District League.

In 2001, he was named Man of the Match in the Herald Cup Final as played for Kingsteignton Athletic against Paignton Villa at Plainmoor.

He currently plays for South Devon Football League side Hele rovers F.C. and in March 2008 was named in their squad for the 2008 Herald Cup Final against Buckland Athletic .

References

1962 births
Living people
Footballers from Huddersfield
English footballers
Association football midfielders
Huddersfield Town A.F.C. players
Wrexham A.F.C. players
York City F.C. players
Northwich Victoria F.C. players
Halifax Town A.F.C. players
English Football League players